Vaucluse Bay Range Rear Light is an active lighthouse located on the east side of the entrance to Vaucluse Bay in Vaucluse, New South Wales, Australia. It serves as the rear range light companion to the Vaucluse Bay Range Front Light, into Vaucluse Bay.

It is one of four lighthouses in a style sometimes called "Disney Castle", the others being Grotto Point Light, Parriwi Head Light and Vaucluse Bay Range Front Light.

The light is shone through a window.

Site operation and visiting 
The light is operated by the Sydney Ports Corporation. It is located on private land, not accessible to the public, but easily seen from 12 Wentworth Road.

See also 

 List of lighthouses in Australia

References

External links 
 

Lighthouses completed in 1910
Lighthouses in Sydney
1910 establishments in Australia